HM Prison Dumfries services the courts of Dumfries and Galloway, Scotland. The establishment serves as a local community prison that holds adult and under 21 males who are remanded in custody for trial and those convicted but remanded for reports. The prison was built in 1883 by Thomas Bernard Collinson and extended with additions in 1988. The old building is a Category B Listed Building. It is one of only three purpose built 19th century prisons still in use, the others being HM Prison Perth and HM Prison Barlinnie.

Residential units
There are five main residential halls A, B, C, D and E and a basement B Zero which includes prisoners on observation/separation.

Notable prisoners
 Kevin Guthrie, actor and convicted sex offender

References 

Prisons in Scotland
Prison
Category B listed buildings in Dumfries and Galloway